Raphitoma bernardoi is a species of sea snail, a marine gastropod mollusk in the family Raphitomidae.

Description
The length of the shell reaches a length of 11 mm.

Distribution
This species occurs in the Atlantic Ocean off Ghana to Angola; off the Cape Verdes.

References

 Rolán E., 2005. Malacological Fauna From The Cape Verde Archipelago. Part 1, Polyplacophora and Gastropoda.

External links
 MNHN, Paris: holotype
 
 Rolán E., Otero-Schmitt J. & Fernandes F. (1998) The family Turridae s. l. (Mollusca, Neogastropoda) in Angola (West Africa). 1. Subfamily Daphnellinae. Iberus, 16: 95–118

bernardoi
Gastropods described in 1998